The 2011 World Figure Skating Championships was a senior international figure skating competition in the 2010–11 season. Medals were awarded in the disciplines of men's singles, ladies' singles, pair skating, and ice dancing.

The competition was originally assigned to Nagano, Japan, and later moved to Tokyo, to be held from March 21–27 at the Yoyogi National Gymnasium with the Japan Skating Federation as the host organization. It was postponed in the wake of the 2011 Tōhoku earthquake and tsunami and later reassigned to Moscow, Russia.

Reaction to the 2011 Tōhoku earthquake and tsunami
Immediately following the Tōhoku earthquake and tsunami that occurred on March 11, 2011, the JSF reported to the ISU that the competition venue was undamaged and the event would be held as planned. However, on March 13, the ISU released a statement saying that it was considering canceling the event and, later that day, the German skating federation announced that it would not send any skaters to the World Championships, with other countries undecided. Although most foreign skaters had planned to fly to Japan from March 16 and later, a few had already arrived in the country on March 11, among them European champion Florent Amodio, and were advised to return home by their skating federations, based on governmental travel advisories.

On March 14, 2011, the ISU published a statement that 2011 Worlds would not be held in Tokyo during the dates originally planned, and that a decision regarding rescheduling or a complete cancellation would be made after further evaluation. The ISU began considering various possibilities, including holding the event in another country. ISU President Ottavio Cinquanta suggested the event could be canceled or postponed until October, with the ISU saying they would make an announcement by March 21. The JSF head, Seiko Hashimoto, said that her federation was hoping to reschedule the event to September or October, but Japanese skating fans felt moving it to another country would be a better option. Although it would oblige a number of skaters to back out of agreements to appear in skating tours, an important source of income for many, many coaches and officials voiced their preference for April–May, citing greater complications arising from an autumn Worlds. However, others noted it would be very difficult for a new host to organize the event in under a month. Typically, a host country of a World Championships has over two years and the shortest period was in 2000 when France organized the event in seven months. On March 21, the ISU announced that the JSF had relinquished its hosting rights and that it was looking into alternate locations, while noting there would be major logistical challenges to organize the event on short notice. The criteria for new candidate hosts included a start date in April or May, 700 hotel rooms, a television production, and two rinks: A competition rink with a minimum 8000 seats and available from the Thursday early morning through Sunday late evening of the following week, and a practice rink from Friday early morning through Friday late evening of the following week. Local expertise, good transportation infrastructure, and quick visa processing were also important factors. ISU President Ottavio Cinquanta said he would support a bid by the Japanese federation to host the 2015 World Championships. In June 2011, Japan was chosen as host for the 2014 World Championships at Saitama.

Bids for re-vote
On March 22, 2011, the International Skating Union announced that six candidates had applied to host the relocated championships.

  Vancouver, Canada
  Lake Placid or Colorado Springs, United States
  Moscow, Russia
  Zagreb, Croatia
  Turku, Finland
  Graz, Austria

On March 24, 2011, the ISU announced that Moscow's Megasport Arena had been chosen as the replacement host for the 2011 World Figure Skating Championships.

Competition notes
Russia pledged to speed up processing of visas and Vladimir Putin dismissed concerns about the cost of organizing the event on short notice. The country had also accepted hosting duties of the World Pentathlon Championships after political instability caused Egypt to step down. The city of Moscow was expected to spend 200 million rubles (5 million euros or US$7 million) on the event.

2010 bronze medalist Laura Lepistö withdrew in early March due to a back injury and was replaced by Juulia Turkkila. Shawn Sawyer dropped out due to a scheduling conflict and was replaced by Kevin Reynolds, while Myriane Samson withdrew due to a knee injury and was replaced by Amelie Lacoste. Sinead Kerr and John Kerr dropped out to recover from shoulder surgery, and later announced their retirement.

Qualification
The event was open to figure skaters from ISU member nations who had reached the age of 15 by July 1, 2010. Based on the results of the 2010 World Figure Skating Championships, each country was allowed between one and three entries per discipline. National associations selected their entries based on their own criteria.

Countries which qualified more than one country per discipline:

Due to the large number of competitors, the men's, ladies', and ice dancing competitions required a preliminary round prior to the main competition. The top 12 men and ladies advanced to the short program and the top 10 ice dancing teams advanced to the short dance.

Entries
195 athletes from 44 countries were scheduled to participate.

Schedule
(Moscow time, UTC+4)

 Sunday, April 24
 Official practices
 Monday, April 25
 14:00 Qualification round: Men
 Tuesday, April 26
 12:00 Qualification round: Ice dancing
 15:30 Qualification round: Ladies
 Wednesday, April 27
 13:00 Men's short program
 18:30 Pairs short program
 Thursday, April 28
 13:30 Men's free skating
 18:30 Pairs free skating
 Friday, April 29
 13:30 Ladies short program
 18:30 Short dance
 Saturday, April 30
 13:30 Ladies' free skating
 18:30 Free dance
 Sunday, May 1
 14:00 Exhibitions

Results
PR: Preliminary round

Men
Patrick Chan won the short program with a record score, while Nobunari Oda placed second and defending champion, Daisuke Takahashi, third. Chan also set record free skating and total scores to win his first World title, after previously winning two silvers. Takahiko Kozuka won his first medal at the World Championships, his previous best result being 6th in 2009. Artur Gachinski, the 2010 Junior World bronze medalist, won the bronze medal, becoming the first men's skater to medal at his senior Worlds debut since Evan Lysacek had done so in 2005; both won a bronze medal in Moscow.

In the men's free skating, Brian Joubert slashed his hand on his skate blade and left drops of blood all over the ice; he completed the program but later required medical attention. Also during the free skating, a screw in Daisuke Takahashi's skate came loose on his first jump. He was able to get it repaired and resumed his program within the three minutes allowed. Oda ruined his chances of a medal by doing an extra triple jump, resulting in a loss of 13 points. Florent Amodio used music with lyrics, which is not allowed in competitive skating with the exception of ice dancing. He was not given the normally required one-point penalty because not enough judges voted for it.

Ladies
2010 Olympic champion Kim Yuna won the short program while Miki Ando placed second. Ando was first in the free skating to win her second World gold medal, her previous title being in 2007. Kim won her fifth World medal, silver, while Carolina Kostner won her third medal, a bronze. Kostner had also won the bronze in 2005, the previous time the event had been held in Moscow. The 2010 World champion, Mao Asada, was sixth.

Pairs
Defending champions, Pang Qing / Tong Jian, were first after the short program, with Aliona Savchenko / Robin Szolkowy in second, and new Russian team, Tatiana Volosozhar / Maxim Trankov, in third. Savchenko and Szolkowy then won the free skating to win their third World title, reclaiming the crown they lost in 2010 and setting a new record score in the free skating and overall. They became Germany's second most successful pair at the event after Maxi Herber and Ernst Baier who won four World titles in the 1930s. Volosozhar and Trankov medaled after only a year together and at their first major international competition. Pang and Tong took the bronze.

In the short program, Eric Radford's nose was broken when Meagan Duhamel's elbow hit him on the descent from a twist, their first element, but they completed the program without a break; the pair were able to compete in the free skating, and finished seventh overall.

Ice dancing
The 2010 Olympic and World Champions, Tessa Virtue and Scott Moir, set a new world record score in the short dance, while Grand Prix Final champions Meryl Davis and Charlie White were second and European champions, Nathalie Pechalat and Fabian Bourzat, were third. Davis and White won the free dance to become the first ice dancers from the United States to win the World title. Virtue and Moir took the silver while Maia Shibutani and Alex Shibutani won the bronze medal in their first trip to the senior World Championships. It was the first North American sweep of the World ice dancing podium. All three medal-winning teams were led by Russian-born, American-based coaches, Igor Sphilband and Marina Zueva. The rest of the top ten was also dominated by Russian coaches: Nathalie Péchalat / Fabian Bourzat (Alexander Zhulin and Oleg Volkov), Kaitlyn Weaver / Andrew Poje (Anjelika Krylova), Ekaterina Bobrova / Dmitri Soloviev (Elena Kustarova and Svetlana Alexeeva), Elena Ilinykh / Nikita Katsalapov (Zhulin and Volkov), Anna Cappellini / Luca Lanotte (had gone to Nikolai Morozov a few months earlier) and Madison Chock / Greg Zuerlein (Shpilband / Zueva). Vanessa Crone / Paul Poirier had one Canadian coach, Carol Lane, and one Soviet-born, Yuri Razguliaiev.

Medals summary

Medalists
Medals for overall placement:

Small medals for placement in the short segment:

Small medals for placement in the free segment:

Medals by country
Table of medals for overall placement:

Table of small medals for placement in the short segment:

Table of small medals for placement in the free segment:

Prize money

References

External links

 ISU page
 Official site
 Starting Order/ Results

World Figure Skating Championships, 2011
World Figure Skating Championships
World Figure Skating Championships
International figure skating competitions hosted by Russia
Sports competitions in Moscow
2011 in Moscow
April 2011 sports events in Russia
May 2011 sports events in Russia